Robiginitalea sediminis is a Gram-negative, strictly aerobic and non-motile bacterium from the genus of Robiginitalea which has been isolated from sediments from a pond which was cultivated with sea cucumbers in Rongcheng in China.

References

Flavobacteria
Bacteria described in 2020